"Spider-Man" is the theme song of the 1967 cartoon show Spider-Man, composed by Paul Francis Webster and Bob Harris. The original song was recorded at RCA Studios in Toronto (where the cartoon was produced) featuring 12 CBC vocalists (members of the Billy Van Singers, and Laurie Bower Singers groups) who added to the musical backing track supplied by RCA Studios, New York. The singers were paid only for the session and have had no residuals from its use since then.

The song has since been adopted as Spider-Man's official theme, including in-universe.

Other versions

Film 
 The Spider-Man (2002) and Spider-Man 2 (2004) film adaptations featured characters as buskers performing the song: Jayce Bartok and Elyse Dinh respectively. Both films also feature the song at the very end of the credits: the 2002 film featured the 1967 version, while the 2004 film featured a re-recording by Michael Bublé. The soundtrack to the 2002 film also features a cover by Aerosmith. Spider-Man 3 (2007) had the song played by a marching band during a scene where Spider-Man arrives at a celebration.
 In The Amazing Spider-Man 2 (2014), Peter has the theme song as a ringtone, and whistles the tune while defeating the Rhino.
 In Spider-Man: Homecoming (2017), the theme (orchestrated by Michael Giacchino) is played during the Marvel Studios logo at the beginning of the film.
 In Spider-Man: Into the Spider-Verse (2018), the Peter Parker of Miles' universe refers to it as his own "catchy theme song", with footage of the 1967 animated series' opening. The intro to the theme is also played during the post credits scene.

Video games 
A remix by Apollo 440 is used in the 2000 action-adventure video game Spider-Man, developed by Neversoft and published by Activision. The song is used in the title screen and the credits, and an instrumental version of it plays in the main menu.

A cover by The Distillers is used in the credits of the 2004 video game Spider-Man 2, the tie-in game for the Sam Raimi film. This cover was re-released in 2019 with a single artwork titled "Spider-Bro" by Linas Garsys.

Covers
In 1993, Canadian group Moxy Früvous recorded a version for their debut album Bargainville. Their version includes more satirical lyrics, as Spider-Man promotes his various items of licensed merchandise. 

In 1995, Ramones recorded a version of the song for the tribute album Saturday Morning: Cartoons' Greatest Hits, later re-released as part of the compilation album Weird Tales of the Ramones.

In 2019, pianist Randy Waldman recorded a jazz version featuring vocals by a capella group Take 6 for his album Superheroes, with theme songs from superhero films and series.

References

1967 songs
Ramones songs
Songs about fictional male characters
Spider-Man in music
Songs from animated series

2001 singles
Michael Bublé songs
Songs with lyrics by Paul Francis Webster
Animated series theme songs
Children's television theme songs